The 2012 Sandwell Metropolitan Borough Council election took place on 3 May 2012 to elect members of Sandwell Metropolitan Borough Council in the West Midlands, England. This was on the same day as other 2012 United Kingdom local elections. In the ward of Great Bridge, the Conservative Party was criticised for fielding a candidate who had the same name as the Labour Party councillor.

Due to being elected 'in thirds', councillors elected at the 2008 Sandwell Council election were defending their seats in 2012.

The Labour Party won every seat, increasing their majority.

Election result

Ward Results

References

External links
Statement of Persons Nominated 

2012 English local elections
2012
2010s in the West Midlands (county)